Kevin Smith (born December 21, 1991) is a former American football wide receiver. He played college football at the University of Washington.

Professional career

Arizona Cardinals
On May 12, 2014, Smith signed with the Cardinals as an undrafted free agent. On June 6, 2014, he was waived by the Cardinals.

Jacksonville Jaguars
On June 5, 2014, Smith was claimed off waivers from the Cardinals. On June 19, 2014, he was waived by the Jaguars.

Seattle Seahawks
On June 25, 2015, Smith was signed by the Seahawks. On August 25, 2015, he was waived. On September 2, 2015, he was re-signed. On September 5, 2015, Smith was waived. On September 6, 2015, Smith was re-signed to the practice squad. On November 17, 2015, Smith was elevated to the active roster. On week 11 2015 vs the Steelers Smith recorded his first NFL reception for 21 yards.
On August 30, 2016, he was placed on injured reserve. On September 3, 2016, he was released from the Seahawks' injured reserve. He was re-signed to the practice squad on November 29, 2016. He was released on December 6, 2016.

Columbus Destroyers
On March 11, 2019, Smith was assigned to the Columbus Destroyers. On April 20, 2019, he was placed on reassignment.

References

1991 births
Living people
American football wide receivers
African-American players of American football
Washington Huskies football players
Players of American football from Compton, California
Arizona Cardinals players
Jacksonville Jaguars players
Los Angeles Kiss players
Seattle Seahawks players
Columbus Destroyers players